Balaguli  is a village in Ramanagara district of Karnataka state of India

References

Villages in Ramanagara district